Schefflera angiensis is a flowering plant in the family Araliaceae and is native to Papua New Guinea.

References

angiensis
Flora of Papua New Guinea